Susanabad may refer to:
 Susanabad, Arak, Markazi Province
 Susanabad, Komijan, Markazi Province
 Susanabad, Salmas, West Azerbaijan Province
 Susanabad, Urmia, West Azerbaijan Province